The Makomanai Sekisui Heim Stadium is a multi-purpose stadium in Sapporo, Japan. During the 1972 Winter Olympics, it hosted the opening ceremonies and the speed skating events. Located inside the Makomanai Park, the stadium holds 17,324 people.

Currently the stadium holds the speed skating Winter Annual National Competition, and until 2011 the Toyota Big Air snowboarding contest.

During summer it is used as tennis courts (up to 8 at the same time) or futsal fields (up to 2 at the same time).

As of 2021, the Olympic cauldron is still seemingly mounted on the original 1972 plinth, just within the stadium's south east perimeter.

Access 
Namboku Line: 25 minutes walking distance from Makomanai Station.

References

External links
 
  

Venues of the 1972 Winter Olympics
Olympic speed skating venues
Sports venues in Sapporo
Minami-ku, Sapporo
Speed skating venues in Japan
Tennis venues in Japan
Olympic stadiums
Sports venues completed in 1971
1971 establishments in Japan